Hexocyclium is an antimuscarinic. It is used in the form of its methyl sulfate, called hexocyclium metilsulfate.

References

Muscarinic antagonists
Phenylethanolamines
Piperazines
Quaternary ammonium compounds
Tertiary alcohols